Eric Pettigrew (born 1960) was a Democratic member of the Washington House of Representatives, representing the 37th district from 2003 to 2021. Pettigrew is African-American. He succeeded Kip Tokuda.

Awards
Pettigrew was the recipient of a 2009 Fuse "Sizzle" Award, "for courageous and principled leadership based  on the progressive values that make our country great." He was given the Sizzle True Patriot Award for working to identify new revenue options to balance nearly $9 billion in cuts to the Washington State 
2009-2011 biennial budget.

References

External links
Washington State Legislature - Rep. Eric Pettigrew official WA House website
Project Vote Smart - Representative Eric Pettigrew (WA) profile
Follow the Money - Eric Pettigrew
2006 2004 2002 campaign contributions

1960 births
Living people
Members of the Washington House of Representatives
Oregon State University alumni
Politicians from Seattle
University of Washington alumni
African-American state legislators in Washington (state)
21st-century American politicians
21st-century African-American politicians